Eugene Joseph Bremer (Bremmer) (July 18, 1916 – June 19, 1971) was an American pitcher in Negro league baseball. He played between 1932 and 1949.

Pitching style 
The 5' 8" righthander pitched exclusively without a windup and utilized an overhand curve.

Playing career

Early Days 
Bremer began his career in 1932 with his hometown New Orleans Crescent Stars. In 1935, he joined Winfield Welch's independent Shreveport Giants.

Cincinnati Tigers 
In 1936, Bremer joined the Cincinnati Tigers, posting a 25-12 record. The Tigers became charter members of the Negro American League in 1937 with Bremer posting a 5-1 record in league play.

Broadview Buffaloes 
Aside from his time with the Tigers in 1936 and 1937, Bremer was also a member of the Broadview Buffaloes, an integrated team in the Canadian Southern Saskatchewan League. The Buffaloes are viewed by many historians as one of the first integrated teams in all of Canada.

Memphis Red Sox 
When the Tigers dissolved prior to the 1938 season, Bremer followed Tigers manager Ted Radcliffe to the Memphis Red Sox. The Red Sox would win the 1938 Negro American League first half pennant, then the league pennant over the Atlanta Black Crackers. In 1940, he was named as the West team's starting pitcher in the annual East-West All-Star Game. During the game, he suffered control problems, walking five batters and giving up two runs in the loss. In his three years in Memphis, Bremer logged a 2-13 record in league play with a 3.72 ERA.

Kansas City Monarchs 
Bremer joined the Kansas City Monarchs late in the 1938 season, making three appearances in league play with a 1-0 record before returning to Memphis the following season.

Monterrey Industriales 
Bremer briefly jumped South of the border and joined the Monterrey Industriales of the Mexican League in 1939, logging a 1-2 record and 3.12 ERA in seven games before returning to Memphis in 1940.

Brief Retirement 
Bremer briefly retired and did not play in the 1941 season.

Cincinnati/Cleveland Buckeyes

1942 
In 1942, Bremer joined former Tigers teammates Bill Jefferson, Sonny Harris, and Ray Robinson on the expansion Cincinnati Buckeyes of the Negro American League. Posting a 5-1 record with a 2.73 ERA in league play, Bremer made the West All-Star team for the second time in his career. Two All-Star games were played in 1942, with Bremer earning the starting nod in the second game, hosted in Cleveland.

Tryout with Indians 
On September 1, 1942, the Chicago Tribune reported that Bremer and teammate Sam Jethroe were to receive tryouts from the Cleveland Indians prior to the 1943 season. Indians president Alva Bradley quickly reneged on his promise, stating to the Cleveland Call and Post that his scouts had seen Bremer, Jethroe, and a third Buckeye, Parnell Woods play in the second East-West Game on August 18 in Cleveland, and based upon that one viewing had decided that the three "did not stack up as material for the Indians".

Car accident 
On September 7, one of three vehicles carrying Buckeyes players and staff crashed on Route 20 near Geneva, Ohio. Teammates Ulysses Brown and Smoky Owens were killed instantly. Four other Buckeyes were injured including Bremer, who was hospitalized and missed the remainder of the season with a fractured skull and concussion.

1943 
Bremer moved with the Buckeyes to Cleveland in 1943, posting a 4-3 record with a .494 ERA.

1944 
In 1944, Bremer was rejected for military service and returned to the Buckeyes, logging a 5-2 record and 2.06 ERA. He was once again selected to play in the All Star Game, pitching 1.2 scoreless innings in the West's victory 7-4 over the East.

1945 
Bremer was the ace of the Buckeyes pitching staff in 1945, posting a 7-1 record and 2.25 ERA in league play, earning another All-Star appearance and leading the Buckeyes to the Negro League World Series. Bremer closed out the All-Star game, coming in to record the final out of 9-6 West victory. In the World Series, Bremer was the star of game two, holding the Homestead Grays to two runs and knocking in the game winning run in the bottom of the ninth with a ground rule double. The Buckeyes went on to sweep the Grays 4-0 for the championship.

1946 
Hampered by injuries, Bremer remained on the Buckeyes roster but was used less frequently, posting a 5.61 ERA in 33.2 innings.

1947 
Bremer returned to the Buckeyes' deep pitching staff in 1947, primarily in a relief role. The Buckeyes won their second pennant in 3 years, but lost to the New York Cubans in the Negro League World Series four games to one. In his only appearance in the series, Bremer gave up 6 runs and 12 hits in a 9-4 complete game loss.

1948 
Bremer made only one recorded league appearance in 1948, starting and pitching a lone complete game loss.

1949 
The Buckeyes moved to Louisville in 1949, and Bremer reported to the team prior to the season opener in May. In an interview with the Call and Post, Bremer reported that he and at least 4 other players quit the team over unpaid salary.

Rochester Royals 
In 1949, the semi-pro Rochester Royals of the Southern Minnesota League signed several Negro League players including Bremer. Bremer suffered from control issues in his first two starting appearances and was moved to left field before injuring himself on a slide into first base.

New Orleans Creoles 
In addition to pitching in Rochester in 1949, Bremer returned to his hometown and briefly joined 1945 Buckeyes teammates Bill Jefferson and Buddy Armour on the independent New Orleans Creoles.

Death and legacy 
Gene Bremer died at age 54 in Cleveland and is buried at Evergreen Memorial Park in Bedford Heights, Ohio. In 2011 Lorain High School honored Bremer between games of a doubleheader on "Rube Foster Night", presenting a plaque to his family. Bremer had eight children and one of his grandsons, J.R. Bremer, played professional basketball for the Cleveland Cavaliers.

Confusion with other players 
While Gene Bremer is credited in other early sources with time on the Cedar Rapids Rockets, a Yankees farm team in 1949, the Gene Bremer listed on the team's rosters is a different player. The Bremers on the 1949 Rockets were twin brothers and Moville, Iowa natives Jack and Gene Bremer (of no relation).

See also 
 1945 Cleveland Buckeyes Season
 1945 Negro League World Series
 East-West All-Star Game

References

External links
 and Baseball-Reference Black Baseball stats and Seamheads

1916 births
1971 deaths
Kansas City Monarchs players
Memphis Red Sox players
New Orleans Crescent Stars players
Cleveland Buckeyes players
Baseball players from New Orleans
Cincinnati Tigers (baseball) players
20th-century African-American sportspeople